The Beebe Theater was a historic performance space on Center Street in Beebe, Arkansas.  It was a two-story brick structure, with a decorative brick-faced marquee extending in front, and decorative brickwork squares and parapet above the second level.  A pair of entries flanked the ticket window in an entry that was recessed and raised a few steps above the sidewalk. Built about 1930, the building was a well-preserved example of vernacular commercial architecture found in smaller Arkansas cities.

The building was listed on the National Register of Historic Places in 1991.  It has been listed as destroyed in the Arkansas Historic Preservation Program database.

See also
National Register of Historic Places listings in White County, Arkansas

References

Theatres on the National Register of Historic Places in Arkansas
Theatres completed in 1930
Buildings and structures in Beebe, Arkansas
National Register of Historic Places in White County, Arkansas
Former buildings and structures in Arkansas
1930 establishments in Arkansas